Edgewood was a former train station for the New York Central Railroad in the hamlet of Edgewood, located in the town of Hunter, Greene County, New York, United States. Built by the Ulster and Delaware Railroad for its branches to Kaaterskill and Hunter, the station opened on September 28, 1881.

Bibliography

References

External links
Ulster and Delaware Railroad Historical Society map

Railway stations in the Catskill Mountains
Former Ulster and Delaware Railroad stations
Railway stations in Greene County, New York
Former railway stations in New York (state)
Railway stations closed in 1940
Railway stations in the United States opened in 1881
1881 establishments in New York (state)